Saint-Arnoult-en-Yvelines is a commune in the Yvelines department in the Île-de-France in north-central France.

Population

Twin towns
 Freudenberg am Main  (1993)
 Terras de Bouro  (2004)

See also
Communes of the Yvelines department

References

Communes of Yvelines